Jimmy Kellogg is an American social media personality known professionally as Jimmy Darts. He posts random acts of kindness videos, often via TikTok and YouTube.

Darts is from Walker, Minnesota. As a teenager, he posted videos on YouTube, eventually amassing 18,000 subscribers before he stopped. After watching a Billy Graham video, he became a Christian. Darts attended the Bethel School of Supernatural Ministry. He went to a capitalism conference and learned how to operate an Amazon business.

Darts posts videos on TikTok. In 2020, Darts was in season 2 of the gameshow Holey Moley. Darts posts random acts of kindness videos. He surprises people in need of money raised through donations from his followers. In one instance, Darts assisted a homeless man get off the streets.

References

External links
 

Living people
People from Walker, Minnesota
American TikTokers
American YouTubers
Prank YouTubers
1996 births